Sommore (born Lori Ann Rambough; May 15, 1966) is an American comedian and actress. Known as the "Diva of Contemporary Comedy," her comedic style features a biting sarcasm and frank discussions about money, sex, and equality between the sexes.

Television and film appearances
Sommore has appeared on various shows including HBO's Def Comedy Jam, Showtime at the Apollo, ComicView, and BET Live from L.A. She has also done guest appearances on television sitcoms The Hughleys and The Parkers, and she has been featured on The Oprah Winfrey Show. She also appeared on Comedy Central Roast of Flavor Flav. In 2008, she appeared as one of the mob members on several episodes of the game show 1 vs. 100.

Her film appearances include Soul Plane, A Miami Tail, Friday After Next, and Something New.

Sommore and fellow African American female comedians Mo'Nique, Laura Hayes, and Adele Givens were the stars on The Queens of Comedy tour, which was filmed and subsequently aired on Showtime and released on DVD.

Sommore launched the worldwide premiere of "The Queen Stands Alone" on September 30, 2008. The release of her stand-up comedy special was a film version of her stand-up act and was written and produced by Sommore as well as her entertainment company One Thousand Kisses, Inc.

Sommore was a winning participant on the sixth season of Celebrity Fit Club.  She lost 11 pounds during the show.

Her 2015 special Sommore: The Reign Continues was aired on Netflix in 2018.

Personal life
Aside from her hometown of Trenton, New Jersey, Sommore has lived in Los Angeles and Fort Lauderdale, Florida. Currently, her primary residence is in Miami. Her father was the poet Doughtry "Doc" Long and her half sister is actress Nia Long.

Filmography

Film/Movie

Television

Comedy releases

References

External links

1966 births
20th-century American comedians
21st-century American comedians
20th-century American actresses
21st-century American actresses
Living people
Actresses from New Jersey
Actors from Trenton, New Jersey
African-American stand-up comedians
American stand-up comedians
American women comedians
Participants in American reality television series
American film actresses
African-American actresses
Morris Brown College alumni
Comedians from New Jersey
Comedians from Georgia (U.S. state)
20th-century African-American women
20th-century African-American people
21st-century African-American women
21st-century African-American people